The 2019 Nashville SC season was the club's second and final season both as an organization and as a member in the USL Championship. In 2018 and 2019, Nashville SC played in the Eastern Conference of the USL Championship, the second-highest level of professional soccer in the US.

2019 player roster

Competitions

Exhibitions
All times are in Central time.

USL Championship

Standings

Results summary

Match results
On December 19, 2018, the USL announced their 2019 season schedule.
All times are in Central time.

USL Cup Playoffs

U.S. Open Cup

As a member of the USL Championship, Nashville SC entered the tournament in the Second Round, played May 14–15, 2019

References

Nashville SC seasons
Nashville SC
Nashville SC
Nashville SC